Janice Burton MBE (born 11 April 1958) is a retired British Paralympic swimmer. Burton competed in B1 events having completely lost sight in both of her eyes. She won a total of 23 Paralympic medals during a career that spanned four Games. As of 2021, Burton remains the second most decorated British Paralympian after cyclist and former swimmer Dame Sarah Storey, and the most decorated British Paralympian in a single sport.

In a career that spanned both the pre- and post- IPC era, Burton competed in both individual and relay races. In the individual events she won five gold medals with three coming in the 1992 Games in Barcelona. As well as achieving Paralympic success she also triumphed in European and World competitions, being crowned champion a total of 15 times.

Burton was appointed a Member of the Order of the British Empire (MBE) in the 1999 New Year Honours list "for services to Sport, especially Swimming, for Visually Impaired People." Since retiring from competitive swimming Janice undertakes public speaking for Guide Dogs and about her Paralympic career. She has also taken part in the display events at the Horse of the Year Show. Burton's sporting retirement coincided with a dedication to further physical challenges despite her disability; at 40 years of age Burton learned to water ski, at 50 she learned to snow ski, and at 60 took up zip wiring.

Notes
 The British Paralympic Association states that Burton has won 23 medals but the Official Paralympic results service only lists 20 results. This is due to Burton's participation in relay races where the competitors' names were not listed in the database. Addendum 1984 USA there are in addition to those listed a further 2 Bronze Medals hanging on our wall. 1988 Seoul there are in addition to those listed a further 1 Bronze medal hanging on our wall, that verifies the 23 total Paralympic medals and bring the international medals to 65.

References

1958 births
Living people
British female freestyle swimmers
Paralympic swimmers of Great Britain
Paralympic gold medalists for Great Britain
Paralympic silver medalists for Great Britain
Paralympic bronze medalists for Great Britain
Swimmers at the 1984 Summer Paralympics
Swimmers at the 1988 Summer Paralympics
Swimmers at the 1992 Summer Paralympics
Swimmers at the 1996 Summer Paralympics
Medalists at the 1984 Summer Paralympics
Medalists at the 1988 Summer Paralympics
Medalists at the 1992 Summer Paralympics
Medalists at the 1996 Summer Paralympics
Members of the Order of the British Empire
Paralympic medalists in swimming